Canada–Kenya relations are the bilateral relations between Canada and the Republic of Kenya. Both nations are members of the Commonwealth of Nations and the United Nations.

History
In December 1963, Kenya obtained its independence from the United Kingdom and in 1964, Canada and Kenya established diplomatic relations. In 1967, Canada opened its first resident High Commission in Nairobi. Canada’s High Commission in Nairobi is Canada's largest diplomatic mission in Africa. 

Canada and Kenya's relationship is founded on a range of shared interests including poverty reduction, sustainable economic growth, the empowerment of women and girls, supporting refugees, and regional security and stability. In August 1981, Canadian Prime Minister Pierre Trudeau paid a visit to Kenya to attend a U.N. energy conference. 

In 1989, Kenyan President, Daniel arap Moi, recalled the Kenyan high commissioner to Canada. Two weeks earlier Somali Canadians had held a protest outside the Kenyan High Commission in Ottawa over a new law requiring the registration of all ethnic Somalis in Kenya. President Moi accused the Canadian government of approving the protest, and demanded an apology. Protests arranged by Moi's Kenya African National Union took place outside the Canadian High Commission and in other cities. In Mombasa an effigy of then High Commissioner Raynell Andreychuk was imprisoned in a street side stall.

In 2008 Canada pledged one million dollars worth of aid to Kenya after the disputed presidential election of President Mwai Kibaki. Canada posted a travel advisory to any of its citizens cautioning them about situation in Kenya. However, a few months later Canada lifted the advisory and stated that the two were back to "business as usual".

In February 2009, the Canadian government announced that it was dropping Kenya from its list of preferred countries to receive foreign aid.  This list includes 18 countries including the West Bank and countries in the Caribbean.

In 2018, Kenyan President Uhuru Kenyatta attended the 44th G7 summit in  La Malbaie, Canada and the Women Deliver Conference in Vancouver in 2019. Between 2017-2018, Canada provided US$83.84 million in international assistance to Kenya.

Trade
In 2018, two-way trade between Canada and Kenya totaled US$174.5 million. Canada's main exports to Kenya include: vehicles and equipment, vegetable products, and textile products. Kenya's main exports to Canada include: vegetable products and textile products.

Resident diplomatic missions
 Canada has a high commission in Nairobi.
 Kenya has a high commission in Ottawa.

See also 
 High Commission of Kenya, Ottawa

References 

Canada–Kenya relations